Amazon Mechanical Turk (MTurk) is a crowdsourcing website for businesses to hire remotely located "crowdworkers" to perform discrete on-demand tasks that computers are currently unable to do. It is operated under Amazon Web Services, and is owned by Amazon. Employers (known as requesters) post jobs known as Human Intelligence Tasks (HITs), such as identifying specific content in an image or video, writing product descriptions, or answering survey questions. Workers, colloquially known as Turkers or crowdworkers, browse among existing jobs and complete them in exchange for a fee set by the employer. To place jobs, the requesting programs use an open application programming interface (API), or the more limited MTurk Requester site. As of April 2019, Requesters could register from 49 approved countries.

History 
The service was conceived by Venky Harinarayan in a US patent disclosure in 2001. Amazon coined the term artificial artificial intelligence for processes outsourcing some parts of a computer program to humans, for those tasks carried out much faster by humans than computers. It is claimed that Jeff Bezos was responsible for the concept that led to Amazon's Mechanical Turk being developed to realize this process.

The name Mechanical Turk was inspired by "The Turk", an 18th-century chess-playing automaton made by Wolfgang von Kempelen that toured Europe, beating both Napoleon Bonaparte and Benjamin Franklin. It was later revealed that this "machine" was not an automaton at all, but was, in fact, a human chess master hidden in the cabinet beneath the board and controlling the movements of a humanoid dummy. Likewise, the Mechanical Turk online service uses remote human labor hidden behind a computer interface to help employers perform tasks that are not possible using a true machine.

MTurk was launched publicly on November 2, 2005. Following its launch, the Mechanical Turk user base grew quickly. In early- to mid-November 2005, there were tens of thousands of jobs, all of them uploaded to the system by Amazon itself for some of its internal tasks that required human intelligence. HIT types have expanded to include transcribing, rating, image tagging, surveys, and writing.

In March 2007, there were reportedly more than 100,000 workers in over 100 countries. This increased to over 500,000 registered workers from over 190 countries in January 2011. In the same year, Techlist published an interactive map pinpointing the locations of 50,000 of their MTurk workers around the world. By 2018, research had demonstrated that while there were over 100,000 workers available on the platform at any time, only around 2000 were actively working.

Overview 
A user of Mechanical Turk can be either a "Worker" (contractor) or a "Requester" (employer). Workers have access to a dashboard that displays three sections: total earnings, HIT status, and HIT totals. Workers set their own hours and are not under any obligation to accept any particular task. Amazon classifies Workers as contractors rather than employees and does not file forms or pay payroll taxes. Classifying Workers as contractors allows Amazon to avoid things like minimum wage, overtime, and workers compensation—a common practice among "gig economy" platforms. Workers must report their income as self-employment income. In 2013, the average wage for the multiple microtasks assigned, if performed quickly, was about one dollar an hour, with each task averaging a few cents. However, calculating people's average hourly earnings on a microtask site is extremely difficult and several sources of data show average hourly earnings in the $5-$9 per hour range among a substantial number of Workers, while the most experienced, active, and proficient workers may earn over $20 per hour. 

Workers can have a postal address anywhere in the world. Payment for completing tasks can be redeemed on Amazon.com via gift certificate (gift certificates are the only payment option available to international workers, apart from India) or be later transferred to a Worker's U.S. bank account.

Requesters can ask that Workers fulfill qualifications before engaging in a task, and they can set up a test in order to verify the qualification. They can also accept or reject the result sent by the Worker, which affects the Worker's reputation. As of April 2019, Requesters paid Amazon a minimum 20% commission on the price of successfully completed jobs, with increased amounts for additional services. Requesters can use the Amazon Mechanical Turk API to programmatically integrate the results of that work directly into their business processes and systems. When employers set up their job, they must specify
 how much are they paying for each HIT accomplished,
 how many workers they want to work on each HIT,
 maximum time a worker has to work on a single task,
 how much time the workers have to complete the work,
as well as the specific details about the job they want to be completed.

Location of Turkers 
Workers have been primarily located in the United States since the platform's inception with demographics generally similar to the overall Internet population in the US. Research shows that within the US workers are fairly evenly spread across states, proportional to each state’s share of the US population. In addition, studies suggest between 15 and 30 thousand people within the US complete at least one HIT each month and about 4,500 new people join MTurk each month.

In 2010, cash payments for Indian workers were introduced, which gave new and updated results on the demographics of workers, who remained primarily within the United States. The researcher behind these statistics runs a website showing worker demographics, updated hourly. In May 2015, it showed that 80% of workers were located in the United States, with the remaining 20% located elsewhere in the world, most of whom were in India. As of May 2019, it showed that approximately 60% of workers were located in the United States and 40% are located elsewhere in the world; approximately 30% are in India.

Uses

Human-subject research 
Since 2010, numerous researchers have explored the viability of Mechanical Turk to recruit subjects for social science experiments. Researchers have generally found that while samples of respondents obtained through Mechanical Turk do not perfectly match all relevant characteristics of the US population, they are also not wildly misrepresentative. As a result, thousands of papers that rely on data collected from Mechanical Turk workers are published each year, including hundreds in top ranked academic journals.

Over the years, a challenge with using MTurk for human-subject research has been maintaining data quality. A study published in 2021 found that the types of quality control approaches used by researchers (such as checking for bots, VPN users, or workers willing to submit dishonest responses) can meaningfully influence survey results, demonstrating so through impact on three common behavioral/mental healthcare screening tools. Even though managing data quality requires work from researchers, there is a large body of research showing how to gather high quality data from MTurk. 

The general consensus among researchers is that the service works best for recruiting a diverse sample; it is less successful with studies that require more precisely defined populations or that require a representative sample of the population as a whole. Many papers have been published on the demographics of the MTurk population. What much of this data shows is that MTurk workers tend to be younger, more educated, more liberal, and slightly less wealthy than the US population overall. Meanwhile, the cost of using MTurk is considerably lower than many other means of conducting surveys, so many researchers continue to use it.

Machine Learning 
Supervised Machine Learning algorithms require large amounts of human-annotated data to be trained successfully. Machine learning researchers have hired Workers through Mechanical Turk to produce datasets such as SQuAD, a question answering dataset.

Missing persons searches 
Since 2007, the service has been used to search for prominent missing individuals. It was first suggested during the search for James Kim, but his body was found before any technical progress was made. That summer, computer scientist Jim Gray disappeared on his yacht and Amazon's Werner Vogels, a personal friend, made arrangements for DigitalGlobe, which provides satellite data for Google Maps and Google Earth, to put recent photography of the Farallon Islands on Mechanical Turk. A front-page story on Digg attracted 12,000 searchers who worked with imaging professionals on the same data. The search was unsuccessful.

In September 2007, a similar arrangement was repeated in the search for aviator Steve Fossett. Satellite data was divided into  sections, and Mechanical Turk users were asked to flag images with "foreign objects" that might be a crash site or other evidence that should be examined more closely. This search was also unsuccessful. The satellite imagery was mostly within a 50-mile radius, but the crash site was eventually found by hikers about a year later, 65 miles away.

Artistic works 
In addition to receiving growing interest from the social sciences, MTurk has also been used as a tool for artistic creation. One of the first artists to work with Mechanical Turk was xtine burrough, with The Mechanical Olympics (2008), Endless Om (2015) and Mediations on Digital Labor (2015). Other work was artist Aaron Koblin's Ten Thousand Cents (2008).

Third-party programming 
Programmers have developed various browser extensions and scripts designed to simplify the process of completing jobs. Amazon has stated that they disapprove of scripts that completely automate the process and preclude the human element. This is because of the concern that the task completion process - e.g. answering a survey -  could be gamed with random responses, and the resultant collected data could be worthless. Accounts using so-called automated bots have been banned. There are services that extend the capabilities to MTurk.

API 
Amazon makes available an application programming interface (API) to give users another access point into the MTurk system. The MTurk API lets a programmer access numerous aspects of MTurk like submitting jobs, retrieving completed work, and approving or rejecting that work. In 2017, Amazon launched support for AWS Software Development Kits (SDK), allowing for nine new SDKs available to MTurk Users. MTurk is accessible via API from the following languages: Python, JavaScript, Java, .NET, Go, Ruby, PHP or C++. Web sites and web services can use the API to integrate MTurk work into other web applications, providing users with alternatives to the interface Amazon has built for these functions.

Use case examples

Processing photos / videos 
Amazon Mechanical Turk provides a platform for processing images, a task well-suited to human intelligence. Requesters have created tasks asking workers to label objects found in an image, select the most relevant picture in a group of pictures, screen inappropriate content, and classify objects in satellite images. Also, crowdworkers have completed tasks of digitizing text from images such as scanned forms filled out by hand.

Data cleaning / verification 
Companies with large online catalogues use Mechanical Turk to identify duplicates and verify details of item entries. Some examples of fixing duplicates are identifying and removing duplicates in yellow pages directory listings and online product catalog entries. Examples of verifying details include checking restaurant details (e.g. phone number and hours) and finding contact information from web pages (e.g. author name and email).

Information collection 
Diversification and scale of personnel of Mechanical Turk allow collecting an amount of information that would be difficult outside of a crowd platform. Mechanical Turk allows Requesters to amass a large number of responses to various types of surveys, from basic demographics to academic research. Other uses include writing comments, descriptions and blog entries to websites and searching data elements or specific fields in large government and legal documents.

Data processing 
Companies use Mechanical Turk's crowd labor to understand and respond to different types of data. Common uses include editing and transcription of podcasts, translation, and matching search engine results.

Research validity 
The validity of research conducted with the Mechanical Turk worker pool has long been debated among experts. This is in largely because questions of validity are complex: they involve not only questions of whether the research methods were appropriate and whether the study was well-executed, but also questions about the goal of the project, how the researchers used MTurk, who was sampled, and what conclusions were drawn.

Most experts generally agree that MTurk is better suited for some types of research questions than others. MTurk appears generally well-suited for questions that seek to understand whether two or more things are related to each other (called correlational research; e.g., are happy people more healthy?) and questions that attempt to show one thing causes another thing (experimental research; e.g., being happy makes people more healthy). Fortunately, these categories capture most of the research conducted by behavioral scientists, and there is evidence that most of the correlational and experimental findings found in nationally representative samples replicate on MTurk.

The type of research that is not well-suited for MTurk is often called "descriptive research." Descriptive research seeks to describe how or what people think, feel, or do. A special case of descriptive research that most people are familiar with is public opinion polling. MTurk is not well-suited to descriptive research, like opinion polling, because it is not a representative sample of the general population. Instead, MTurk is a nonprobability, convenience sample. Descriptive research is best conducted with a probability-based, representative sample of the population researchers want to understand. When compared to the general population, people on MTurk are often younger, more highly educated, more liberal, and less religious.

Labor issues 
Mechanical Turk has been widely criticized by journalists and activists for its interactions with and use of labor, but the scientific evidence gathered does not align so well with the most common critiques.  

Among the critics of MTurk, computer scientist Jaron Lanier has noted how the design of Mechanical Turk "allows you to think of the people as software components" that conjures "a sense of magic, as if you can just pluck results out of the cloud at an incredibly low cost". A similar point is made in the book “Ghostwork” by Mary L. Gray and Siddharth Suri.

More than invisibility, however, critics of MTurk argue that workers are forced onto the site by precarious economic conditions and then exploited by requesters with low wages and a lack of power when disputes occur. Journalist Alana Semuels’s article in The Atlantic is typical of the criticisms of MTurk.

Academic research shows that the story of MTurk is not simple. While some papers have obtained findings that serve as the basis for common criticisms or align with what critics of MTurk have alleged, others contradict those arguments. 

A notable contradiction to the common criticisms of MTurk is a paper published by the team at CloudResearch. The CloudResearch study is the only representative sample of workers from MTurk gathered to-date, which means it represents an important improvement to previous research that is susceptible to multiple forms of sampling bias, including oversampling highly active workers.

What the CloudResearch data show is that only about 7% of people on MTurk view completing HITs as something akin to a full-time job. Most people report that MTurk is a way to earn money during their leisure time or a side gig. In 2019, the typical worker spent 5-8 hours per week and earned in the ballpark of $7 per hour. The data also show that workers do not report rampant mistreatment at the hands of requesters. In fact, workers report trusting requesters more than employers outside of MTurk. Similar findings are presented in a review of MTurk by the Fair Crowd Work organization, which is a collective of crowd workers and unions.

Monetary compensation 
The minimum payment that Amazon allows for a task is one cent. Because tasks are typically simple and repetitive the majority of tasks pay only a few cents, but well-paying tasks are not absent from the site.

Many criticisms of MTurk stem from the fact that a majority of tasks offer low wages. In addition, workers are considered independent contractors rather than employees. Independent contractors are not protected by the Fair Labor Standards Act or other legislation that protects workers’ rights. Workers on MTurk must compete with others for good HIT opportunities as well as spend time searching for tasks and other actions that they are not compensated for. 

The low payment offered for many tasks has fueled criticism of Mechanical Turk for exploiting and not compensating workers for the true value of the task they complete. One study of 3.8 million tasks completed by 2,767 workers on Amazon's Mechanical Turk showed that "workers earned a median hourly wage of about $2 an hour" with 4 percent of workers earning more than $7.25 per hour. However, a large limitation of this study is that it reports no demographic information about its sample. Therefore, readers and researchers cannot assess how well the workers and tasks in the study represent MTurk more broadly.   

There are several sources of data that show wages on MTurk are higher than $2 per hour. For example, both the Pew Research Center and the International Labour Office published data indicating people made around $5.00 per hour in 2015.   Another, more recent publication focused on workers in the US indicated that average wages were at least $5.70 an hour, and data from the CloudResearch study found overall average wages of about $6.61 per hour. Meanwhile, there is some evidence that very active and experienced people can earn $20 per hour or more though this is likely a small group of workers.

Fraud 
The Nation magazine said in 2014 that some Requesters had taken advantage of Workers by having them do the tasks, then rejecting their submissions in order to avoid paying them. Though this claim is sometimes repeated elsewhere, the available data indicate that rejections are fairly rare. Workers report having a small minority of their HITs rejected, perhaps as low as 1%.  

In the Facebook–Cambridge Analytica data scandal, Mechanical Turk was one of the means of covertly gathering private information for a massive database. The system paid persons a dollar or two to install a Facebook connected app and answer personal questions. The survey task, as a work for hire, was not used for a demographic or psychological research project as it might have seemed. The purpose was instead to bait the worker to reveal personal information about the worker's identity that was not already collected by Facebook or Mechanical Turk.

Labor relations 
Others have criticized that the marketplace does not have the ability for the workers to negotiate with the employers. In response to the growing criticisms of payment evasion and lack of representation, a group has developed a third party platform called Turkopticon which allows workers to give feedback on their employers allowing other users to avoid potentially unscrupulous jobs and to recommend superior employers. Another platform called Dynamo was created to allow the workers to collect anonymously and organize campaigns to better their work environment, including the Guidelines for Academic Requesters and the Dear Jeff Bezos Campaign. Amazon has made it harder for workers to enroll in Dynamo by closing the request account that provided workers with a required code for Dynamo membership. Workers created third-party plugins to identify higher paying tasks, but Amazon updated their website to prevent these plugins from working. Additionally, there have been worker complaints that Amazon's payment system will on occasion stop working - a major issue for workers requiring daily payments.

Related systems 

Mechanical Turk is comparable in some respects to the now discontinued Google Answers service. However, the Mechanical Turk is a more general marketplace that can potentially help distribute any kind of work tasks all over the world. The Collaborative Human Interpreter (CHI) by Philipp Lenssen also suggested using distributed human intelligence to help computer programs perform tasks that computers cannot do well. MTurk could be used as the execution engine for the CHI.

In 2014 the Russian search giant Yandex launched a similar system called Toloka that is similar to the Mechanical Turk.

See also 
 CAPTCHA, which challenges and verifies human work at a simple online task
 Citizen science
 Microwork

References

Further reading 
 Business Week article on Mechanical Turk by Rob Hof, November 4, 2005.
 Wired Magazine story about "Crowdsourcing," June 2006.
 Salon.com article on Mechanical Turk by Katharine Mieszkowski, July 24, 2006.
 New York Times article on Mechanical Turk by Jason Pontin, March 25, 2007.
 Technology Review article on Mechanical Turk, "How Mechanical Turk is Broken," by Christopher Mims, January 3, 2010.
  (discusses labor relations)

External links 
 
 Requester Best Practices Guide, Updated February 2015.
 

Mechanical Turk
Crowdsourcing
Human-based computation
Social information processing
Web services